Mount Whitney (Paiute: Tumanguya; Too-man-i-goo-yah) is the highest mountain in the contiguous United States and the Sierra Nevada, with an elevation of . The mountain's west slope is in Sequoia National Park and the summit is the southern terminus of the John Muir Trail, which runs  from Happy Isles in Yosemite Valley. The eastern slopes are in Inyo National Forest in Inyo County.

Geography 

Mount Whitney's summit is on the Sierra Crest and the Great Basin Divide. It lies near many of the Sierra Nevada's highest peaks.

The mountain is partially dome-shaped, with its famously jagged ridges extending to the sides. Mount Whitney is above the tree line and has an alpine climate and ecology. Very few plants grow near the summit: one example is the sky pilot, a cushion plant that grows low to the ground. The only animals are transient, such as the butterfly Parnassius phoebus and the gray-crowned rosy finch.

Hydrology 
The mountain is the highest point on the Great Basin Divide. Waterways on the peak's west side flow into Whitney Creek, which flows into the Kern River. The Kern River terminates at Bakersfield in the Tulare Basin, the southern part of the San Joaquin Valley. Today, the water in the Tulare Basin is largely diverted for agriculture. Historically, during very wet years, water overflowed from the Tulare Basin into the San Joaquin River, which flows to the Pacific Ocean.

From the east, water from Mount Whitney flows to Lone Pine Creek, where most of the water is diverted into the Los Angeles Aqueduct via a sluice. Some water in the creek is allowed to continue on its natural course, joining the Owens River, which terminates at Owens Lake, an endorheic lake of the Great Basin.

Elevation measurements 
The estimated elevation of Mount Whitney's summit has changed over the years. The technology of elevation measurement has become more refined and, more importantly, the vertical coordinate system has changed. An older plaque on the summit (sheet metal with black lettering on white enamel) reads "elevation 14,496.811 feet", but this was estimated using the older vertical datum (NGVD29) from 1929. Since then the shape of the Earth (the geoid) has been estimated more accurately. Using a new vertical datum established in 1988 (NAVD88) the benchmark is now estimated to be .

Geology 

Whitney's eastern slope is far steeper than its western slope because the Sierra Nevada is the result of a fault block that is analogous to a cellar door: the door is hinged on the west and is slowly rising on the east.

The rise is caused by a fault system that runs along the Sierra's eastern base, below Mount Whitney. Thus, the granite that forms Whitney is the same as that which forms the Alabama Hills, thousands of feet lower down. The raising of Whitney (and the downdrop of the Owens Valley) is due to the same geological forces that cause the Basin and Range Province: the crust of much of the intermontane west is slowly being stretched.

The granite that forms Mount Whitney is part of the Sierra Nevada Batholith. In Cretaceous time, masses of molten rock that originated from subduction rose underneath what is now Whitney and solidified underground to form large expanses of granite. In the last 2 to 10 million years, the Sierra was pushed up, enabling glacial and river erosion to strip the upper layers of rock to reveal the resistant granite that makes up Mount Whitney today.

Climate 

Mount Whitney has an alpine tundra climate (ET) under the Köppen climate classification. Summer temperatures are highly variable, ranging from below freezing to highs near  during extreme heat waves in the Owens Valley.

There is no weather station at the summit, but this climate table contains interpolated data for an area below the summit.

Exploration history 

In July 1864, the members of the California Geological Survey named the peak after Josiah Whitney, the State Geologist of California and benefactor of the survey. During the same expedition, geologist Clarence King attempted to climb Whitney from its west side, but stopped just short. In 1871, King returned to climb what he believed to be Whitney, but having taken a different approach, he actually summited nearby Mount Langley. Upon learning of his mistake in 1873, King finally completed his own first ascent of Whitney, but did so a month too late to be first. On August 18, 1873, Charles Begole, A. H. Johnson, and John Lucas, all of nearby Lone Pine, had become the first to reach the contiguous United States' highest summit. As they climbed the mountain during a fishing trip to nearby Kern Canyon, they called the mountain Fisherman's Peak.

In 1881, Smithsonian Astrophysical Observatory founder Samuel Pierpont Langley remained on the summit for some time, making daily observations of the solar heat. Accompanying Langley in 1881 was another party consisting of Judge William B. Wallace of Visalia, W. A. Wright and Reverend Frederick Wales. In his memoirs, Wallace wrote, "The Pi Ute [Paiute] Indians called Mount Whitney Too-man-i-goo-yah, which means 'the very old man.' They believe that the Great Spirit who presides over the destiny of their people once had his home in that mountain." The spelling Too-man-i-goo-yah is a transliteration from the indigenous Paiute Mono language. Other variations are Too-man-go-yah and Tumanguya.

In 1891, the United States Geological Survey's Board on Geographic Names decided to recognize the name Mount Whitney. Despite losing out on their preferred name, Lone Pine residents financed the first trail to the summit, engineered by Gustave Marsh, and completed on July 22, 1904. Four days later, the new trail enabled the first recorded death on Whitney. Having hiked the trail, U.S. Bureau of Fisheries employee Byrd Surby was struck and killed by lightning while eating lunch on the summit. In response, Marsh began work on the stone hut that became the Smithsonian Institution Shelter, completing it in 1909.

A movement began after World War II to rename the mountain for Winston Churchill,  but the name Mount Whitney persisted.

Climbing routes

Trails 

Permits are required year-round, and to prevent overuse the Forest Service issues a limited number of permits between May 1 and November 1. It holds an annual lottery for hiking and backpacking permits on the trail. Applications are accepted from February 1 through March 15. Any permits left over after the lottery is completed typically go on sale April 1. Most hikers plan to stay one or two nights camping along the route. Those in good physical condition sometimes attempt to reach the summit and return to Whitney Portal in one day. A one-day hike requires a day-use permit that prohibits the use of overnight camping gear (sleeping bag and tent). Day hikers often leave Whitney Portal before sunrise and hike from 12 to 18 hours.

Longer approaches to Whitney arrive at its west side, connecting to the Mount Whitney Trail near the summit by way of the John Muir Trail.

Scrambles 

The Mountaineer's Route, a gully on the north side of the east face first climbed by John Muir, is considered a scramble,  (PD+). The fastest recorded time up this route to the summit and back to the portal is 3 hours 10 minutes, by Jason Lakey of Bishop, California.

Technical climbs 
The steep eastern side of the mountain offers a variety of climbing challenges. The East Face route, first climbed in 1931, is one of the Fifty Classic Climbs of North America routes, and involves technical free climbing but is mostly class 4. Other routes range up to grade 5.10d.

South of the main summit is a series of minor summits that are completely inconspicuous from the west but appear as a series of "needles" from the east. The routes on these include some of the finest big-wall climbing in the high Sierra. Two of the needles were named after participants in an 1880 scientific expedition to the mountain: Keeler Needle for James Keeler and Day Needle for William Cathcart Day. The latter has been renamed Crooks Peak after Hulda Crooks, who hiked up Mount Whitney every year until well into her nineties.

See also

 List of mountain peaks of California
 List of highest points in California by county
 List of U.S. states by elevation
 List of the highest major summits of the United States
 List of the most prominent summits of the United States
 List of the most isolated major summits of the United States
 Whitney Classic

References

Further reading

External links
 
 
 
 

Fourteeners of California
Highest points of U.S. states
Inyo National Forest
Mountains of Inyo County, California
Mountains of Sequoia National Park
Mountains of the John Muir Wilderness
Mountains of Tulare County, California
Symbols of California
Highest points of United States national parks
Mount Whitney
Mountains of Northern California